Michael Frederick McFadden (born September 7, 1964) is an American businessperson and the co-CEO of Lazard Middle Market, a Minneapolis-based investment bank.  McFadden was the 2014 Republican nominee for the United States Senate in Minnesota against incumbent Democrat Al Franken.

Early life and education
McFadden was born in 1964. He grew up in a Catholic family of Irish descent in Omaha, Nebraska, the eldest of five siblings.

McFadden attended the University of St. Thomas in St. Paul, Minnesota, graduating magna cum laude with a Bachelor of Arts degree in economics. He played varsity football for the Tommies alongside his friend and roommate Vince Flynn, the late author of the New York Times best-selling Mitch Rapp book series. After college, McFadden earned a J.D. from Georgetown University.

Career
Between college and law school, McFadden worked as a marketing representative for IBM. After law school, he worked briefly as an attorney in New York City before deciding to move back to Minnesota.

Lazard Middle Market
After moving back to the Twin Cities in the early 1990s, McFadden joined Goldsmith, Agio, Helms and Co., the investment firm that would later become Lazard Middle Market. The firm had approximately a dozen employees. By 2007, the company grew to over 90 employees in five cities. That year, McFadden was named co-CEO and the firm was sold to Lazard. McFadden's role at Lazard Middle Market was to advise privately held companies on mergers and acquisitions. When asked by the Minneapolis Star Tribune to describe what Lazard Middle Market does for its clients, McFadden replied, "it's pretty simple. If you want to sell your house, you hire a Realtor. If you want to sell your business, you hire me."

On May 31, 2013, Lazard Middle Market announced that McFadden had taken a leave of absence from the firm.

Allen Edmonds Shoe Corporation
In 2006, McFadden represented Wisconsin-based Allen Edmonds Shoe Corporation in its sale to Goldner Hawn Johnson & Morrison. After the deal, McFadden was invited to serve on the shoe company's board of directors. Allen Edmonds is in a small minority of companies that still produce most of their shoes domestically. When the Great Recession hit, McFadden and the other board members stopped taking pay, and, in 2009, McFadden invested in the company to help keep it afloat. The company bounced back from the recession, even selling its American-made shoes in countries like China.

Cristo Rey Jesuit High School
McFadden serves on Cristo Rey Jesuit High School's board of directors. The school, in Minneapolis's Phillips neighborhood, has made educating students from poor families its mission. In 2013, 100% of Cristo Rey's graduating seniors were accepted to college or university.

2014 U.S. Senate run

McFadden kicked off his campaign for U.S. Senate on May 29, 2013. It was his first bid for public office. McFadden faced incumbent Democratic Senator Al Franken in the general election. McFadden received endorsements from former U.S. Senators Rudy Boschwitz, Norm Coleman and Rod Grams, all Republicans from Minnesota. His platform included jobs, education and addressing the national debt.

McFadden was critical of the Affordable Care Act, and Franken's vote to pass it. His campaign released a web video featuring Franken promising that people could keep their current plans under the act, but Franken's campaign stated that the video was taken out of context.

In July 2013, McFadden stated, "I'm working with a team of experts to come forward with detailed [plans] on health care. It's not enough just to say no to Obamacare. We need to provide an alternative. And we will, and we're working on that."

A critic of government shutdowns, McFadden has called the tactic "draconian", and criticized Franken for scheduling a celebrity-filled fundraiser during the 2013 shutdown.

In his first four months as a candidate, McFadden raised over $1.5 million for his campaign. In the Republican primary on August 13, McFadden won the party's nomination.

McFadden's Senate campaign was unsuccessful, receiving 42.91 percent of the vote to Franken's 53.15 percent.

Personal life
Mike and his wife Mary Kate live in Sunfish Lake, Minnesota, with their six children. His two eldest sons, Conor and Patrick, played football for Stanford University.

References

1964 births
Living people
American people of Irish descent
American philanthropists

Georgetown University Law Center alumni
University of St. Thomas (Minnesota) alumni
Businesspeople from Omaha, Nebraska
People from Sunfish Lake, Minnesota
Catholics from Minnesota
Minnesota Republicans
Al Franken